Mackay William Morton (born 26 March 1934) is a Scottish Christian author and educator. Graduated from St Andrews University, Dundee College of Education, Free Church of Scotland College. In 1971 Elected an Honorary Member of the British Scholars Association of Peru, in 1981 Awarded the Diploma of Honour by the Government of Peru for service to Education in Peru. In 2001 was Moderator of the General Assembly of the Free Church of Scotland. Awarded with Associate Fellow of the Australian Principals’ Centre, Melbourne (AFAPC), Fellow of the Institute for Contemporary Scotland (FCS), Fellow of the Royal Geographical Society (FRGS) and Fellow of the Royal Scottish Geographical Society (FRSGS)  on 2012.

Publications
 1980: Opinions on the Teaching of History Articles in Spanish in the magazine “The Teaching of History” published by the Riva-Agüero Institute of the Catholic University of Lima.
 1980: Thomas Chalmers: A Short Appreciation.
 1993:  Chapter in “Crown Him Lord of All" - Church and School and the Care of Youth.”- ed. C. Graham: Knox Press.
 1996:  Chapters in "A Witness for Christ" - Andrew Melville and his Contribution to the Development of the Scottish Universities” and “The Getting of Wisdom”- ed. R. Ward.
 2001: The Light of the Word on the Plight of the World: General Assembly Address

Memberships / Affiliations
 Australian College of Educators
 Vice-Chairman and Treasurer of the Edinburgh Centre of the Royal Scottish Geographical Society	
 Royal Geographical Society
 Scottish Evangelical Theology Society

References

1934 births
Living people
People from Dundee
Scottish educators
Fellows of the Royal Scottish Geographical Society
Alumni of the University of St Andrews
Fellows of the Royal Geographical Society